Black Hawk is an unincorporated community in the town of Troy, Sauk County, Wisconsin, United States.

History
A post office called Black Hawk was established in 1866, and remained in operation until 1906. The community was named after Black Hawk (1767–1838), Sauk and Fox leader.

References

Unincorporated communities in Sauk County, Wisconsin
Unincorporated communities in Wisconsin